Edward Frank Parker (born 26 April 1939) was a first-class cricketer who played for Rhodesia in the Currie Cup.

Parker made his first two first-class appearances in the 1958/59 Currie Cup but didn't play again for over three years. He made his return in a match against a touring International XI team and took the wicket of Basil D'Oliveira. For the rest of the decade, Parker was a regular in the Rhodesian side for their Currie Cup campaigns and had his best season with the ball in 1967/68 when he took 24 wickets at 20.41. This tally included a match haul of 10 for 124 against Orange Free State at Bloemfontein.

In 1978, at the age of 39, Parker made a return to cricket, representing Rhodesia B in the President's Cup and Zimbabwe-Rhodesia B in the 1979/80 Castle Bowl tournament. His batting improved considerably and despite coming into the Castle Bowl with only two first-class half centuries on his resume, he finished the tournament with 416 runs at 46.22, including four half centuries.

He crossed to South African team Griqualand West for the 1981/82 SAB Bowl whom he captained in his three matches.

References

External links

1939 births
Living people
Rhodesian people of British descent
White Rhodesian people
Zimbabwean cricketers
Rhodesia cricketers
Griqualand West cricketers